Haloxylon is a genus of shrubs or small trees, belonging to the plant family Amaranthaceae. Haloxylon and its species are known by the common name saxaul.
According to Dmitry Ushakov, the name borrowed from the Kazakh "seksevil". In modern Kazakh language, the shrub is called "seksewil". According to the school etymological dictionary, the name saksaul was borrowed in the 19th century from the Turkic languages.

Description
The species of genus Haloxylon are shrubs or small trees  (rarely up to ) tall, with a thick trunk and many branches. The branches of the current year are green, from erect to pendant. The leaves are reduced to small scales. The inflorescences are short shoots borne on the stems of the previous year. The flowers are very small, as long or shorter than the bracteoles, bisexual or male. The two stigmas are very short. In fruit, the perianth segments develop spreading wings.

Distribution and habitat
The genus Haloxylon is distributed in southwest and Central Asia, from Egypt to Mongolia and China (Sinkiang and Kansu), where it grows in sandy habitats (psammophyte).

Taxonomy
The genus name Haloxylon was published by Alexander Bunge (ex Eduard Fenzl) in 1851, with the type species Haloxylon ammodendron.

The genus belongs to the subfamily Salsoloideae in the family Amaranthaceae, It consists of only two species:
 Haloxylon ammodendron (C.A.Mey.) Bunge ex Fenzl. (Synonym: Haloxylon aphyllum) – black saxaul
 Haloxylon persicum Bunge ex Boiss. – white saxaul
Phylogenetic research revealed that several species formerly included in Haloxylon are not related to this genus. They are now classified to genus Hammada, with exception of the former Haloxylon stocksii (syn. Haloxylon recurvum), which has been moved to Salsola stocksii.

The common name saxaul, sometimes sacsaoul or saksaul, comes from the Russian саксаул (saksaul), which is from Kazakh сексеуiл (seksewil).

Ecology
In the deserts of Central Asia, a large number of birds are associated with saxaul, including the saxaul sparrow.

Uses 
In the former bed of the Aral Sea, saxaul trees are being planted to stop the wind picking up contaminated sand from the dried up sea bed and spreading them through the atmosphere. The plan is to cover the entire former bed with a forest.

References

External links

 

Amaranthaceae
Amaranthaceae genera
Taxa named by Eduard Fenzl